Jean Joseph Emond Woods (1850 – 1928) was a Canadian physician and public servant.

Early life
The son of John Robert Woods and Zoé Desautels, Woods studied medicine at McGill University, graduating in 1875.

Personal life
Woods married Corrine Bourgeois and moved into their new Aylmer, Quebec Main Street home office in 1883.

Public office
In 1885, Woods was named a public vaccinator and medical officer by the Aylmer Board of Health. In 1918, he became Quebec's inspector of prisons and asylums, so moved to Lachine.

Death
Woods died in Lachine in 1928.

References

1850 births
1928 deaths
Mayors of places in Quebec